Júlio César da Silva e Souza (born February 26, 1980 in Itaguai) is a retired Brazilian football player.

He played for Turkish side Gaziantepspor, joining them from Rapid București. He was released during the winter break because he did not play as good as expected for the money spent on him, he was the highest paid member of the squad and also Rapid had financial problems. In the 2009–2010 season he scored 13 goals for Gaziantepspor, making him the top goalscorer of the team and the second goalscorer of the Turkish Süper Lig, after Ariza Makukula.

Júlio César also played for Greek side AEK Athens from 2005 to 2008. He scored the goal in the famous 1–0 win for AEK against AC Milan in front of over 69.000 spectators in the Olympic Stadium Athens with a direct free kick. Before leaving AEK Athens Julio Cesar stated his last words to the Greek press: I will never forget AEK and it will always be in my heart, I will return some day.

Honours
Fluminense
 Campeonato Carioca: 2002
Lokomotiv Moscow
 Russian Championship: 2002
 Russian Super Cup: 2003
Coritiba
 Campeonato Paranaense: 2013

References

External links
 
 
 

1980 births
Living people
Brazilian footballers
Brazilian expatriate footballers
Association football wingers
AEK Athens F.C. players
C.F. Estrela da Amadora players
Fluminense FC players
Figueirense FC players
Coritiba Foot Ball Club players
Gil Vicente F.C. players
FC Lokomotiv Moscow players
Gaziantepspor footballers
FC Rapid București players
FC Goa players
Ceará Sporting Club players
Mirassol Futebol Clube players
Madureira Esporte Clube players
Expatriate footballers in Portugal
Expatriate footballers in Russia
Expatriate footballers in Romania
Expatriate footballers in Greece
Expatriate footballers in Turkey
Expatriate footballers in India
Brazilian expatriate sportspeople in Portugal
Brazilian expatriate sportspeople in Russia
Brazilian expatriate sportspeople in Romania
Brazilian expatriate sportspeople in Greece
Brazilian expatriate sportspeople in Turkey
Brazilian expatriate sportspeople in India
Campeonato Brasileiro Série A players
Campeonato Brasileiro Série B players
Indian Super League players
Russian Premier League players
Liga I players
Primeira Liga players
Süper Lig players
Super League Greece players
People from Itaguaí